Edmund Kowalec (1900 – 12 April 1944) was a Polish rower. He competed in the men's coxed four event at the 1924 Summer Olympics.

References

External links
 

1900 births
1944 deaths
Polish male rowers
Olympic rowers of Poland
Rowers at the 1924 Summer Olympics
Place of birth missing